Genet Yalew Kassahun (born 31 December 1992) is an Ethiopian professional long-distance runner who competes in track, cross country and road running events. Her half marathon best of 66:26 minutes is the Ethiopian record and ranks her in the top ten all-time for the sport.

As an age-category athlete she won several individual medals, first taking 3000 metres bronze at the 2009 World Youth Championships in Athletics, then the junior silver at the 2011 IAAF World Cross Country Championships and finally another track bronze at the 2011 African Junior Athletics Championships. As part of the Ethiopian junior cross country team, she shared in a silver in 2010 before leading the team to gold in the 2011 edition. She began competing on the IAAF Diamond League senior circuit in the 2011 and 2012 seasons.

Genet was a medal-winning team member for Ethiopia at the 2013 IAAF World Cross Country Championships and won a second team silver at the 2014 IAAF World Half Marathon Championships. She shared in the team gold medal at the 2015 IAAF World Cross Country Championships, but was not a point-scoring member of the team, having finished in tenth. On the track, she came short of a medal over 10,000 metres at the 2014 African Championships in Athletics, and was again off the podium at the 2015 African Games, taking fifth in the 5000 m. She finished in that same place at the 2016 IAAF World Half Marathon Championships, which helped an Ethiopian team of Netsanet Gudeta, Genet and Dehininet Demsew to the silver medals.

International competitions

Circuit wins
Egmond Half Marathon: 2016
Tilburg 10K: 2015
Jan Meda Cross Country: 2014
Obudu Ranch International Mountain Race: 2011

Personal bests
3000 metres – 9:01.75 min (2010)
5000 metres – 14:48.43 min (2012)
10,000 metres – 31:08.82 min (2015)
10 kilometres – 30:58 min (2015)
Half marathon – 66:26 min (2016)

References

External links

All-Athletics profile 

Living people
1992 births
Ethiopian female long-distance runners
Athletes (track and field) at the 2015 African Games
African Games competitors for Ethiopia
21st-century Ethiopian women